Astre may refer to :

 Astres FC
 Atmosphere-Space Transition Region Explorer
 Pontiac Astre
 Astre Inc.